Les Ramoneurs de menhirs are a Breton Celtic punk group formed in 2006. Its members include Éric Gorce on the bombardon, Richard Bévillon on the bagpipes, the traditional vannetais singer Gwenaël Kere and Loran, guitarist from the group Bérurier Noir. Most of their songs are sung in the Breton language.

Biography 
The group formed in 2006 after Bévillon and Gorce invited Louise Ebrel, Maurice Jouanno and the ex-Bérurier Noir Loran on their album of traditional Breton music Kerne Izel, released on Coop Breizh. Their first album, Dañs an Diaoul (Dance of the Devil) was released in 2006 by the former label of Bérurier Noir, Folklore de la zone mondiale. The singer Louise Ebrel, daughter of Eugénie Goadec, a famous traditional Breton musician, is a guest on the album.

Les Ramoneurs de menhirs participated at the Festival Interceltique de Lorient in 2007, having performed outside the official programme. They also played at the BetiZFest. From January 2008, they went on tour in Europe (Scotland, France, Switzerland). During their tour in Scotland, they opened for the Scottish Celtic punk group Oi Polloi along with Na Gathan. In April 2008, the group won the category "Best Musical Group" at the competition Kan Ar Bobl.

In April 2010, they released a second album before Maurice Jouanno left the group, replaced by singer Gwenaël Kere. On 7 July, they released a new album, Tan ar bobl (Fire of the People). The group performed at the Hellfest on 21 June 2015, and in 2017 with Bagad Kemperle.

Band members

Current members 
 Loran: lead guitar, backing vocals, drum machine (2006 – present)
 Éric Gorce: bombard, biniou kozh, backing vocals (2006 – present)
 Richard Bévillon: biniou kozh, bombarde, backing vocals (2006 – present)
 Gwenaël Kere: lead vocals (2014 – present)

Guest 
 Louise Ebrel: lead vocals (2006–2020)

Past member 
 Maurice Jouanno dit "Momo": lead vocals (2006–2014)

Discography

LP 
 Four songs – compiled on the CD Concerto pour détraqués (Bérurier Noir with Éric Gorce on the bagpipes and Jean-Pierre Beauvais on the bombardon in the song "Vive le feu".

CD 
 2006 : Kerne Izel, Coop Breizh (Bévillon and Gorce accompanied by Louise Ebrel, Maurice Jouanno (traditional singer from Vannes) and by Loran, guitarist of the group Bérurier Noir, for the songs "Gavotte d'honneur Bigouden" and "Yaw ha yaw ha yaw".
 2007 : Dañs an Diaoul
 K.A (3:34)
 BellARB (5:24)
 Dañs Gwadek 1 (Plinn) (4:03)
 Yaw Ha Yaw Ha Yaw (An Dro) (3:34)
 Nomades (2:47)
 Edan Ur Blez (Laridé) (5:41)
 Na Gast Na Matezh (Gavotte Pourlet) (3:31)
 Captain Kirk (2:39)
 Dañs Gwadek 2 (Plinn) (4:29)
 Vive Le Feu (6:01)
 'Vel Un Tour-Tan (Gavotte d'honneur) (3:54)

2010 : Amzer an dispac'h

Unnek Gwezh
Oy ! Oy ! Oy !
La Blanche Hermine
Menez Unan
Tamm Kreiz
Menez Daou
If the Kids ar United
Marijanig
Ya'at'eeh
Auschwitz planète
Breizhistañs

2014: Tan ar Bobl

Son Ar Gewier
Ni Veway
Ar We'enn-Avalow
Ibrahim
Exarhia
Pussy Riotal
Hir Ew Geniñ
Azawad Dieub
Viva La Revolution
Makhnovtchina
Ar Paotr Disoursi

Vinyl 
 2008 : Dañs an Diaoul (certain songs changed from the CD)
Side A :
 Gavotte Bigouden
 K.A.
 Dans Gwadek 1
 Gavotte d'honneur
 Nomades

Side B :
 Yaw Ha Yaw Ha Yaw Ha
 Edan ur blez
 Dans Gwadek 2
 Bal Plinn
 Bell'ARB

References

External links 

Official website
the group's page on the site of the label Folklore de la zone mondiale

Celtic punk groups
Breton musical groups
Breton-language singers
Musical groups established in 2006
2006 establishments in France